The 1971 Open Championship was the 100th Open Championship, played 7–10 July at Royal Birkdale Golf Club in Southport, England. Lee Trevino won the first of his consecutive Open Championships, one stroke ahead of Lu Liang-Huan. It was the third of his six major titles and his second consecutive; he won the U.S. Open less than a month earlier in a playoff over Jack Nicklaus.

Trevino became the fourth player to win both the U.S. Open and the Open Championship in the same year, joining Bobby Jones  Gene Sarazen (1932), and Ben Hogan (1953). Subsequent winners of both were Tom Watson (1982) and Tiger Woods (2000); all six are Americans.

Trevino also won the Canadian Open the previous week near Montreal for three national titles in 1971, all won in less than a 

This was the last major championship of 1971 because the PGA Championship was played in February instead of its traditional date in August. (In 2019 the PGA moved to May.) Trevino's win, therefore, assured that Americans won all four major championships in 1971 (Charles Coody won the Masters Tournament and Nicklaus captured the PGA). This was the fifth time this had happened in golf history.  (It has happened five more times since 1971 but none since 1982.)

Course

Source:
Lengths of the course for previous Opens:
 1965: , par 73
 1961:    
 1954:

Past champions in the field

Made both cuts

Source:

Missed the first cut

Source:

Round summaries

First round
Wednesday, 7 July 1971

Source:

Second round
Thursday, 8 July 1971

Source:
Amateurs: Bonallack (−3), Melnyk (+4),Humphreys (+6), Berry (+7), Carr (+8), Foster (+9), Birtwell (+11), Bird (+12), Rolley (+14).

Third round
Friday, 9 July 1971

Source:
Amateurs: Bonallack (−2), Melnyk (+4).

Final round
Saturday, 10 July 1971

Source:
Amateurs: Bonallack (−1), Melnyk (+6)

References

External links
1971 - Royal Birkdale (Official site)

The Open Championship
Golf tournaments in England
Open Championship
Open Championship
Open Championship